The New Jersey Department of Law and Public Safety is a governmental agency in the U.S. state of New Jersey that focuses on protection of the lives and property of New Jersey residents and visitors. The department operates under the supervision of the New Jersey attorney general. The department is responsible for safeguarding "civil and consumer rights, promoting highway traffic safety, maintaining public confidence in the alcoholic beverage, gaming and racing industries and providing legal services and counsel to other state agencies."

Offices
The following offices are under the control of the department and overseen by the attorney general: Child Protection and Advocacy; Corrections and State Police; Education; Employment Litigation; Environmental Protection; Health and Human Services; Judiciary and Prosecutors; Labor and Community Affairs; Tort Litigation; Transportation, and Treasury and Taxation.

References

External links
New Jersey Department of Law and Public Safety / Office of the Attorney General

Law and Public Safety
New Jersey law